Abelardo José Estorino López (29 January 1925 – 22 November 2013) was a Cuban dramatist, director, and theater critic.

Biography
Abelardo Estorino was born in Unión de Reyes on 29 January 1925. After Bachillerato studies in Matanzas, he trained as a dental surgeon and practiced as such for three years (1954–1957), dividing time between the job and his literary vocation. He wrote his first play, Hay un muerto en la calle, in 1954. It remains unpublished. The success of his second dramatic work, El peine y el espejo, written in 1956 but released in 1960, placed him firmly in the world of literature and drama.

After studying stage direction at the Teatro Estudio de Cuba and working with Julio Matas and Herberto Dumé, it was the 1960s that marked the growth and direction of his work. El robo del cochino (1961) and La casa vieja (1964) were his most notable plays from this period. In that decade Estorino traveled to the Soviet Union and Czechoslovakia, joined the National Council of Culture, and participated in the First National Congress of Writers and Artists of Cuba. During this time he received the first recognitions of his long career, such as mentions for the Casa de las Américas Prize for El robo del cochino and La casa vieja, the latter for the production directed by Berta Martínez. He continued the decade with Los mangos de Caín (1965) and El tiempo de la plaga, in addition to the comedy Las vacas gordas.

Estorino was the life partner of artist Raúl Martínez. In the 1970s, in spite of the marginalization that he suffered, like other intellectuals, due to his homosexuality, he did not stop writing. After directing an adaptation of Lope de Vega's La discreta enamorada, he wrote La dolorosa historia del amor secreto de Don José Jacinto Milanés, a literary work that required him to do complex research into Spanish colonial Cuba. At this point his output constituted an intimate journey through the intricacies of the human being as part, for good and for bad, of that social structure that is the family, the core on which Estorino focuses to look at the reality of society as a whole. This explains why many of his plays were successfully performed in theaters in Europe (Norway, Sweden, Spain) and the Americas (United States, Chile, Venezuela). In the 1980s, his works included Ni un sí ni un no, Pachencho vivo o muerto, Que el diablo te acompañe (1987), Las penas saben nadar (1989), and Morir del cuento, whose production was awarded in Spain, at the Theater Festival of Havana, and by the National Union of Writers and Artists of Cuba.

Abelardo Estorino died in Havana on 22 November 2013.

Works
 1956: Hay un muerto en la calle (unpublished)
 1956: El peine y el espejo
 1960: Premiere of El peine y el espejo under the direction of Herberto Dumé
 1961: Premiere of El robo de cochino under the direction of Herberto Dumé
 1962: Wrote and premiered the musical comedy Las vacas gordas and Las impuras, an adaptation of the novel by 
 1964: Wrote and premiered La casa vieja at Teatro Estudio under the direction of Berta Martínez
 1965: Magaly Alabau directed his play Los mangos de Caín
 1967: Directed La ronda de Schnitzler, together with 
 1968: Wrote puppet theater versions of El tiempo de la plaga and La dama de las camelias (La Dame aux Camélias)
 1972: Directed  by Lope de Vega
 1973: Wrote La dolorosa historia del amor secreto de Don José Jacinto Milanés
 1975: Directed Los pequeños burgueses (The Petty Bourgeois) by Maxim Gorky
 1979: Directed Casa de muñecas (A Doll's House) by Henrik Ibsen
 1980: Wrote and directed Ni un si ni un no
 1981: Directed Aire frío by Virgilio Piñera
 1982: Wrote Pachencho vivo o muerto, premiered at the Musical Theater of Havana
 1983: Wrote and directed Morir del cuento
 1984: Anthology Teatro published
 1985: Roberto Blanco premiered his play La dolorosa historia del amor secreto de Don José Jacinto Milanés
 1986: Directed La verdadera culpa de Juan Clemente Zenea by Abilio Estévez
 1987: Wrote Que el diablo te acompañe
 1988: Directed La Malasangre by Griselda Gambaro
 1990: Directed Aristodemo by 
 1992: Premiered Vagos rumores
 1994: Premiered Parece blanca
 1995: Vagos rumores and Las penas saben nadar performed at the 
 1996: Vagos rumores and Las penas saben nadar performed at the Repertorio Español in New York
 1997: Parece blanca performed at the Caracas International Festival
 1997: Directed the premiere of Medea by 
 1998: Vagos rumores and Parece blanca performed at the Repertorio Español in New York
 1999: Anthology Vagos rumores y otras obras published
 2000: Las penas saben nadar performed at the Bogotá Ibero-American Theater Festival
 2000: Premiered El baile at the Sala Hubert de Blanck in Havana
 2000: The text El baile released by publishing house Alarcos
 2000: Premiere of El baile at the Repertorio Español in New York
 2001: Las penas saben nadar performed at the First Festival Internacional del Monólogo in Miami

Awards and recognitions
 1961: Mention for the Casa de las Américas Prize for El robo de cochino
 1964: Mention for the Casa de las Américas Prize for La casa vieja
 1984: Award for Best Production at the Theater Festival of Havana for Morir del cuento
 1984: Literary Critics' Award for Teatro
 1985: Special mention for the Cau Ferrat Award at the Sitges Film Festival for Morir del cuento
 1989: Segismundo Award for Best Text at the Festival del Monólogo for Las penas saben nadar
 1992: National Prize for Literature
 1996: Literary Critics' Award for Vagos rumores
 1997: ACE Award for Best Direction for Vagos rumores
 1997: Guggenheim Fellowship for Drama and Performance Art
 1999: Critics' Award for the editing of Vagos rumores y otras obras
 2000: HOLA Award for Best Direction for El baile
 2000: Theatre Communications Group fellowship for the premiere of El baile and Parece blanca in New York
 2002: National Prize for Theater
 2006: Inducted into the Academia Cubana de la Lengua

References

1925 births
2013 deaths
20th-century Cuban writers
Cuban LGBT dramatists and playwrights
Cuban dramatists and playwrights
Cuban literary critics
Cuban theatre directors
Cuban gay writers
Gay dramatists and playwrights
People from Matanzas Province
University of Havana alumni
21st-century LGBT people